Marcum is a family name. Notable persons with that name include:
 Deanna B. Marcum (1946–2022), American librarian and nonprofit leader 
 John Marcum (1995-present), ARCA founder, NASCAR official 
 Johnny Marcum (1909–1984), baseball pitcher
 Justin Marcum, politician
 Kent Marcum, composer
 Leo Marcum (born 1942), American politician, lawyer
 Shaun Marcum (born 1981), baseball pitcher
 Tim Marcum (1944–2013), football coach

Other
 Marcum Q-function, mathematical function
 Marcum, Kentucky
 Markham (disambiguation)
 Morecambe (disambiguation)